A Woman's Way is a 1908 American silent short drama film directed by D. W. Griffith. It was filmed in Coytesville and Little Falls, New Jersey.

Cast
 George Gebhardt as A Woodsman
 Harry Solter as A Camper
 Linda Arvidson as The Camper's Wife
 Dorothy Bernard
 Arthur V. Johnson as Man with Rifle
 Florence Lawrence
 Herbert Miles
 Mabel Trunnelle as The Woodsman's Daughter

References

External links
 

1908 films
1908 drama films
1908 short films
Silent American drama films
American silent short films
American black-and-white films
Films directed by D. W. Griffith
Films shot in Fort Lee, New Jersey
1900s American films
American drama short films